Flufenoxuron is an insecticide that belongs to the benzoylurea chitin synthesis inhibitor group, which also includes diflubenzuron, triflumuron, and lufenuron.

Flufenoxuron is a white crystalline powder.  It is insoluble in water, is not flammable, and is not an oxidizer.

Toxicology and safety
Flufenoxuron toxicity to humans and other mammals is low, but it has a very high bioaccumulation in fish.

References

Insecticides